Oldany Island (formerly Oldney Island) is an uninhabited island in Assynt, Sutherland, north-west Scotland.

The name is Norse in origin and possibly means fruit.

Geography
Oldany Island is a large tidal island at the southwestern entrance to Eddrachillis Bay/Kylesku. Handa Island is to the north, across Eddrachillis Bay; Eilean Chrona is to the south west and Sgeir nan Gall (Norsemen's Skerry) is to the north. The island is part of the Assynt-Coigach National Scenic Area, one of 40 in Scotland.

The settlement of Oldany is on the adjacent mainland. The island has long been used for grazing sheep. Oldany island is owned by the Turner family.

Notes and references

Islands of Sutherland
Tidal islands of Scotland
Uninhabited islands of Highland (council area)